Hau is a surname. It may be a variant spelling of the Chinese surname Hao 郝, the Cantonese spelling of the Chinese surname Hou 侯, or a Danish surname.

Variant of Hao
 Hau Pei-tsun or Hao Baicun (1919–2020), former Premier of the Republic of China
 Hau Lung-pin or Hao Longbin (born 1952), Mayor of Taipei, son of Hau Pei-tsun

Variant of Hou
 Alyson Hau (born 1983), a Hong Kong DJ/presenter

Other
 Brian Hau (born 1982), Hong Kong singer
 Eduard Hau (1807–), Baltic German artist
 Lene Hau (born 1959), Danish physicist
 Woldemar Hau (1816–1895), Baltic German painter

See also 
 Hao (surname)
 Hou (surname)

Hau